The 1987 WCT Scottsdale Open was a men's WCT and Nabisco Grand Prix tennis tournament played on outdoor hard courts in Scottsdale, Arizona in the United States. It was the second edition of the tournament and was held from October 5 through October 12, 1986. Third-seeded Brad Gilbert won the singles title.

Finals

Singles

 Brad Gilbert defeated  Eliot Teltscher 6–2, 6–2
 It was Gilbert's only singles title of the year and the 11th of his career.

Doubles

 Rick Leach /  Jim Pugh defeated  Dan Goldie /  Mel Purcell 6–3, 6–2
 It was Leach's 2nd title of the year and the 2nd of his career. It was Pugh's 2nd title of the year and the 2nd of his career.

See also
 1987 Virginia Slims of Arizona – women's tournament in Scottsdale

References

External links
 ITF tournament edition details

 
WCT Scottsdale Open
WCT Scottsdale Open
WCT Scottsdale Open
Tennis Channel Open